Acalyptris psammophricta is a moth of the family Nepticulidae. It was described by Edward Meyrick in 1921. It is found from India westwards to Tunisia and northwards to Mongolia, including Pakistan, Iran, the United Arab Emirates, Israel and Libya.

The habitat consists of deserts and coastal dunes.

The wingspan 4.9–6.9 mm for males and 5.1–6.4 mm for females. Adults are on wing from February to May in the Middle East and North Africa, from May to June and August to September in central Asia and in October in India.

References

Nepticulidae
Moths of Africa
Moths of Asia
Moths described in 1921